Jeju Strait is a strait between the Korean Peninsula (South Jeolla Province) and Jeju Island (Jeju Province). The strait is the boundary between the Sea of Japan and the Yellow Sea as defined by the International Hydrographic Organization, and is considered part of the East China Sea in Korea.

Ecology 
The Kuroshio current, a north-flowing ocean current, results in warm water all year round.

See also
 Jeju Undersea Tunnel
 Korea Strait
 Sea of Japan
 Namhae
 Yellow Sea
 East China Sea

References

Straits of South Korea